The Yellow Line is a rapid transit line of the Washington Metro system that runs between Huntington Station in Virginia and Greenbelt station in Maryland. It consists of 21 stations in Fairfax County, Alexandria County, and Arlington County in Virginia, as well as Washington, D.C. and Prince George's County, Maryland. 

The Yellow Line shares tracks with the Green Line from L'Enfant Plaza northward to Greenbelt, and the Blue Line between Pentagon and King Street – Old Town. It has only two stations that are not shared by any other lines (Eisenhower Avenue and Huntington), and only two sections of track that are not shared by any other lines – the section south of King Street – Old Town, and the section between the Pentagon and L'Enfant Plaza stations, crossing the Potomac River.

Prior to May 2019, the Yellow Line ended at Mount Vernon Square during peak hours and at Fort Totten station during off-peak hours.

As of September 10, 2022, all Yellow Line service has been suspended and replaced by Blue and Green Line service due to the 14th Street Bridge rehab project and tunnel which closed the tracks the Yellow Line operates on.

History 
Planning for Metro began with the Mass Transportation Survey in 1955 which attempted to forecast both freeway and mass transit systems sufficient to meet the needs of the region projected for 1980. In 1959, the study's final report included two rapid transit lines which anticipated subways in downtown Washington. Because the plan called for extensive freeway construction within the District of Columbia, alarmed residents lobbied for federal legislation creating a regional transportation agency with a moratorium on freeway construction  through July 1, 1962. The new agency, the National Capital Transportation Administration, issued a 1962 Transportation in the National Capital Region report, which did not include the route that became the Yellow Line. A central route under 7th Street in downtown was only added in 1967 primarily to serve the "inner city". In March 1968, the Washington Metropolitan Area Transit Authority (WMATA) board approved its  Adopted Regional System (ARS) which included the Yellow Line from Franconia and Backlick Road (in Springfield) to Greenbelt.

While a cut-and-fill tunnel for Yellow Line was built under 7th Street and U Street, both street traffic and pedestrian access on those streets were difficult. The result was the loss of the traditional retail businesses along the route. The downtown segment of the line was originally projected to open in September 1977. Obtaining approval of the District of Columbia and Prince Georges' County of the exact alignment of the Yellow Line north of U Street delayed construction. Originally, the ARS called for the line to be placed in the median strip of the planned North Central Freeway, but after that road was cancelled, the route of the replacement subway tunnel became controversial, resulting in years of expensive delays.

Service on the Yellow Line began on April 30, 1983, adding Archives to the system and linking the two already-built stations of Gallery Place and Pentagon with a bridge across the Potomac River. It was extended beyond National Airport by four stations to Huntington on December 17, 1983, the first station outside the Capital Beltway. When the Green Line link to U Street opened on May 11, 1991, it acted as an extension of the Yellow Line until the southern Green Line branch was completed. When Green Line service began, the Yellow Line was truncated at Mount Vernon Square, where a pocket track exists to relay trains.

The Yellow Line was originally planned to follow a slightly different route in Virginia. The plan would have sent Yellow Line trains to Franconia–Springfield, with Blue Line trains serving Huntington. This was changed due to a shortage of rail cars at the time of the completion of the line to Huntington. Because fewer rail cars were required to operate Yellow Line service than would be required to run Blue Line service out to Huntington – due to the Yellow Line's shorter route – the line designations were switched. From 1999 to 2008, the Yellow Line operated to Franconia–Springfield on July 4, as part of Metro's special service pattern on that day.

In 1998, Congress changed the name of the Washington National Airport to the Ronald Reagan Washington National Airport with the law specifying that no money be spent to implement the name change. As a result, WMATA did not change the name of the National Airport station (which never included the full name of the airport). In response to repeated inquiries from Republican congressmen that the station be renamed, WMATA stated that stations are renamed only at the request of the local jurisdiction. Because both Arlington County and the District of Columbia were controlled by Democrats, the name change was blocked. Finally, in 2001, Congress made changing the station's name a condition of further federal funding.

In May 2018, Metro announced an extensive renovation of platforms at twenty stations across the system. To accommodate these platform reconstructions, the Blue and Yellow Lines south of Ronald Reagan Washington National Airport would be closed from May 25, to September 8, 2019, in what would be the longest line closure in Metro's history. As a result, all Yellow and Blue line services terminated at Ronald Reagan Washington National Airport during the closure.

All stations were reopened beginning on June 28, 2020.

Shuttle buses were provided to the closed stations while Green Line service replaced service between Mount Vernon Square and Fort Totten.

On June 15, 2022, WMATA announced that all Yellow Line trains will be suspended from September 10, 2022 to May 2023 in order to tie in completion of Potomac Yard station and to rehab the 14th Street Bridge the Yellow Line operates over.

Extensions 
In 2006, Metro board member Jim Graham and D.C. Mayor Anthony A. Williams proposed re-extending Yellow Line service to Fort Totten station or even to Greenbelt station, which was the originally planned northern terminus for the line. Their proposal did not involve construction of any new track, because either extension would run along the same route as the existing Green Line and would thus relieve crowding on that line. Suburban members of the board initially resisted the proposal. Through a compromise that also increased service on the Red Line, on April 20, 2006 the WMATA board approved a Yellow Line extension to the Fort Totten station during off-peak hours. An 18-month pilot program began on December 31, 2006, at a cost of $5.75 million to the District of Columbia. On June 26, 2008, due to the success of the 18-month trial, the Yellow Line was permanently extended to operate all the way up to the Fort Totten Metro Station at all other times other than during weekday rush hour/peak commuter periods.
As part of the Rush Plus initiative trial, additional Yellow Line trains began running between Greenbelt and Franconia-Springfield starting June 18, 2012; these trains were discontinued on June 25, 2017 due to budget cuts. On May 25, 2019, the Yellow Line returned to Greenbelt, this time serving the station at all hours.

Route 

The southern terminus of the Yellow Line is adjacent to Kings Highway (Virginia Route 241) in Fairfax County, Virginia. The line heads northeast on a bridge over Hunting Creek and the Washington Beltway (Interstate 95) to a station just south of Eisenhower Avenue, which serves a number of government office buildings including the United States Patent Office. The Yellow Line then merges with the Blue Line and follows the right-of-way of the RF&P Railroad through the City of Alexandria. The line enters a short tunnel under U.S. Route 1. After crossing a bridge over Four Mile Run, the line enters Arlington County on an elevated structure above the National Airport parking lots. At the north end of the airport, the Yellow Line enters a tunnel under 18th Street South and South Hayes Street in Crystal City. The tunnel continues along the southwest face of the Pentagon which is a 2-level station to facilitate a fork with the Blue Line. After the Pentagon station, the Yellow Line emerges from its tunnel east of the Pentagon and crosses the Charles R. Fenwick Bridge over the George Washington Memorial Parkway, the Potomac River, and Ohio Drive. At the end of the bridge, the Yellow Line re-enters a tunnel near the Jefferson Memorial and crosses under the Washington Channel. The tunnel merges with the Green Line tunnel under 7th Street Southwest just south of the L'Enfant Plaza. The joint Yellow—Green Line tunnel continues north through downtown Washington under 7th Street, turns west under Florida Avenue and U Street, and then north under 14th Street Northwest. The tunnel then turns toward the northeast under Park Road and New Hampshire Avenue.  The tunnel then bends eastward under Rock Creek Cemetery and Fort Totten Park to emerge just before entering the lower level of the Fort Totten station. Until May 2019, this was the northern terminal for Yellow Line service, with the track continuing northeast as just the Green Line to the Greenbelt terminus. Since then, the Yellow Line continues along these tracks to Greenbelt with the Green Line.

The Yellow Line needs 10 six-car trains (60 rail cars) to run at peak capacity. Internally, the Yellow Line in Virginia was called the "Huntington Route" (C) and the route through the District of Columbia and beyond to Greenbelt as the "Greenbelt Route" (E). As of March 2018, all Yellow Line trains are required to only run 8-car trains.

Stations 

The following stations are along the line, from south to north.

Future 
On November 16, 1995, WMATA and the developer of the Potomac Yard area of Alexandria, Virginia, signed an agreement to construct a new station between Braddock Road and National Airport that will be financed by the developer. The Federal Transit Administration, in cooperation with WMATA, the National Park Service and The City of Alexandria government, completed an environmental impact statement for the project in June 2016. The station is expected to open in May 2023.

A second improvement project involves building a pedestrian tunnel to interconnect the Gallery Place station with Metro Center. A July 2005 study proposed connecting the eastern mezzanine of Metro Center with the western mezzanine of Gallery Place that are only one block apart. The proposed connection would reduce the number of passengers that use the Red Line to transfer between the Yellow Line and the Blue and Orange lines at Metro Center. As of 2011, the project remained unfunded.

See also 

 List of Washington Metro stations

Notes

References

Further reading

External links 

 world.nycsubway.org: Yellow Line

 
Washington
Railway lines opened in 1983
1983 establishments in Virginia